The Ryan FR Fireball was an American mixed-power (piston and jet-powered) fighter aircraft designed by Ryan Aeronautical for the United States Navy during World War II. It was the Navy's first aircraft with a jet engine. Only 66 aircraft were built before Japan surrendered in August 1945. The FR-1 Fireball equipped a single squadron before the war's end, but did not see combat. The aircraft ultimately proved to lack the structural strength required for operations aboard aircraft carriers and was withdrawn in mid-1947.

Design and development
Design of the FR-1 began in 1943 to a proposal instigated by Admiral John S. McCain Sr. for a mixed-powered fighter because early jet engines had sluggish acceleration that was considered unsafe and unsuitable for carrier operations. Ryan received a contract for three XFR-1 prototypes and one static test airframe on 11 February 1943 with the first two prototypes delivered in 14 months. Another contract was placed for 100 aircraft on 2 December 1943 and a later contract on 31 January 1945 increased the total of FR-1s on order to 700.

The XFR-1 was a single-seat, low-wing monoplane with tricycle landing gear. A  Wright R-1820-72W Cyclone radial engine was mounted in the fighter's nose while a  General Electric I-16 (later redesignated as the J-31) turbojet was mounted in the rear fuselage. It was fed by ducts in each wing root which meant that the wing had to be relatively thick to house the ducts and the outward-retracting main landing gear. To simplify the fuel system, both engines used the same grade of avgas. The cockpit was positioned just forward of the leading edge of the wing and the pilot was provided with a bubble canopy which gave him excellent visibility. The XFR-1 had the first laminar flow airfoil in a navy carrier aircraft.

The Fireball was armed with four .50 in (12.7 mm) M2 Browning machine guns with 300 rounds per gun. They were mounted in the center section of the wing, immediately outboard of the air intakes for the jet engine. Four 5-inch (127 mm) rockets could be carried under each outer wing panel and two hardpoints were provided under the center section for 1,000 lb (454 kg) bombs or  drop tanks. Armor plates were provided in front and behind the pilot's seat and for the oil cooler.

The first XFR-1 made its first flight on 25 June 1944 without its jet engine, but this was installed shortly afterward. The second prototype first flew on 20 September 1944. Test flights confirmed wind tunnel tests that revealed a lack of longitudinal stability because the center of gravity had been miscalculated. In addition, the circular rear fuselage of the FR-1 gave less stability than the slab-style fuselage of the Grumman F4F Wildcat that was used as a model for the stability calculations. A new tail with enlarged vertical and horizontal stabilizers was designed and retrofitted to the prototypes. The original Douglas double-slotted flaps proved to be unsatisfactory during flight testing, but all three prototypes and the first 14 production aircraft were built with them before they were replaced with a single-slotted flap.

The first prototype was lost in a crash at NAS China Lake on 13 October 1944. Investigation showed that the wing structure was not strong enough to resist compressibility effects. This was cured by doubling the number of rivets in the outer wing panels. The third prototype crashed on 5 April when the canopy blew off during a high-speed pass over Lindbergh Field.

Carrier suitability tests began aboard the escort carrier  in early January 1945. The aircraft successfully made five catapult takeoffs using the piston engine as well as three takeoffs using both engines. No problems were reported when landing aboard the carrier.
 
The FR-1 Fireball was further developed into the XFR-2 which utilized a 1,425 hp (1,063 kW) Wright R-1820-74W in place of the -72W. One single airframe was converted to this configuration. No prototypes were built for the next proposed variant, the FR-3, which would have used a General Electric I-20 turbojet. Both of these projects were canceled with the end of the war. The fastest Fireball was the XFR-4, which had a Westinghouse J34 turbojet and was approximately 100 mph (160 km/h) faster than the FR-1. The turbojet's air intakes were moved from the wing roots to the fuselage in front of the wing; they were covered by electrically powered doors to lessen drag when the aircraft was flying only on its piston engine. The XFR-4 was intended to serve as a testbed for the turbojet installation on the XF2R-1 Dark Shark. This was the final variant; the piston engine was replaced with a General Electric XT31-GE-2 turboprop, but only one prototype was built.

On 2 December 1943, orders for 100 production FR-1s were placed, with a follow-up order of 1,000 additional fighters in January 1945. All of the contracts were contingent on the aircraft successfully completing carrier trials. Only 66 Fireballs were completed by November 1945 as orders for 1,044 FR-1s were canceled on VJ Day.

Operational history

One squadron, VF-66, received its first Fireballs in March 1945, but they never saw combat. On 1 May, three of the squadron's aircraft were craned aboard the carrier  to attempt to qualify seven pilots, but two of the fighters were damaged while landing. One missed the arresting gear and hit the crash barrier while the other aircraft's nose gear collapsed. The following month the pilots qualified and were on pre-embarkation leave when the Japanese surrendered. The squadron was decommissioned on 18 October with all pilots and aircraft transferred to VF-41.

It has been claimed that a Fireball of VF-41 became the first aircraft to land under jet power on an aircraft carrier, albeit without prior planning, on 6 November 1945. After the radial engine of an FR-1 failed on final approach to the escort carrier , the pilot managed to start the jet engine and land, barely catching the last arrestor wire before hitting the ship's crash barrier. However, there is evidence that the aircraft may have still benefited from some residual power from its Wright R-1820 and therefore the landing was not purely under jet power. The squadron was attempting to qualify its pilots for carrier operations during this time, but only 14 of its 22 pilots made the six required takeoffs and landings. A number of accidents occurred when the nose gear failed on landing, but the pilots were at least partly responsible as they were slamming the nose gear onto the deck after landing on the main gear.

The squadron qualified on the escort carrier  in March 1946, but nose gear problems persisted and cut the cruise short. Ryan installed a steel fork for the nosewheel, but inspections also revealed evidence of partial wing failures so the aircraft was limited to maneuvers not to exceed 5 Gs. VF-41 suffered three fatal accidents in 1946 before being redesignated as VF-1E on 15 November 1946. One ensign collided with the target banner during gunnery practice and spun into the water. A few months later, the squadron commander was performing a barrel roll when his wing broke off and he struck another Fireball, killing both pilots.

VF-1E conducted carrier qualification in March 1947 aboard the escort carrier  and only eight pilots successfully qualified, not least because the FR-1s were proving to be too fragile to endure repeated carrier landings. During one brief deployment in June aboard , one aircraft broke in two during a hard landing. Subsequent inspections of the squadron's aircraft showed signs of structural failure and all the Fireballs were withdrawn by 1 August 1947.

After the withdrawal of the type from service, except for a few examples retained for modifications and testing, the FR-1s were scrapped.

Variants
XFR-1
Military designation of the prototype Model 28 aircraft, three built.
FR-1 Fireball
Single-seat fighter aircraft, 66 built.
FR-2
Conversion with a Wright R-1820-74W replacing earlier piston engine, one aircraft modified.
FR-3
Proposed variant with a General Electric I-20 replacing earlier jet engine; never built.
XFR-4
Variant with Westinghouse J34; one built.J34-WE-12.

Operators

 United States Navy

The "Firebirds" squadron was known under three names:
 VF-66 (March 1945 – 15 October 1945)
 VF-41 (15 October 1945 – 1 August 1947), redesignated VF-1E on 15 November 1946.

Survivors
Only a single example, FR-1 BuNo 39657, still survives. Deployed first to the NASA Ames Research Center, the aircraft served as an instructional airframe at a technical school before being acquired by the Planes of Fame Air Museum at Chino, California from a technical school located in San Luis Obispo, California in the 1960s. After restoration to static display condition, 39657 was rolled out at Chino on 13 June 2009.

Specifications (FR-1)

See also

References

Notes

Citations

Bibliography
 Brown, Eric. Wings on My Sleeve: The World's Greatest Test Pilot tells his Story. London: Orion Books, 2006. .
 Ginter, Steve. Ryan FR-1 Fireball and XF2R-1 Darkshark, Naval Fighters Number 28. Simi Valley, California: Ginter Books, 1995. .
 Green, William. "Ryan FR-1 Fireball". 'War Planes of the Second World War, Volume Four: Fighters. London: Macdonald & Co. (Publishers) Ltd., Sixth impression 1969, First edition 1961, pp. 186–187. .
 Green, William and Gordon Swanborough. "Ryan FR-1 Fireball". WW2 Fact Files: US Navy and Marine Corps Fighters. London: Macdonald and Jane's, 1976, pp. 66–68. .
 McDowell, Ernest. FR-1 Fireball  (Mini in action number 5). Carrollton, Texas: Squadron/Signal Publications, 1995. .
 Swanborough, Gordon and Peter M. Bowers. United States Navy Aircraft since 1911. London: Putnam Aeronautical Books, Third edition 1990. .

Further reading

External links

 Ryan FR-1 "Fireball" / XF2R-1 "DarkShark" page on Jets45 website
 "Prop+Jet=Fireball." Popular Mechanics, November 1945, pp. 8–9.

Carrier-based aircraft
Mixed-power aircraft
Ryan F1R
Ryan aircraft
Low-wing aircraft
Aircraft first flown in 1944